Henri Lédéchaux was a French rose breeder based in Villecresnes, Île-de-France.

His roses include 
 'Adolphe Noblet', red blend Hybrid Perpetual, 1861
 American Beauty, Hybrid Perpetual, 1875
 'Clovis', red Hybrid Perpetual, 1868
 'Henri Ledéchaux', carmine-pink Hybrid Perpetual, before 1868
 'Joséphine Lédéchaux', salmon-orange Hybrid Perpetual, 1855
 'Mademoiselle Adèle Jougant', light yellow Tea, Climber, 1863
 'Thyra Hammerich', light pink Hybrid Perpetual, 1868

References 

Rose breeders
Year of birth missing
Year of death missing